Jurek Martin OBE  (born 1942) is a British-born journalist.

Martin, a Financial Times columnist and former foreign editor and twice Washington, D.C. bureau chief was noted for his weekly "Letter to America" column before becoming a columnist for FT.com and a contributor to the newspaper.

Martin was born in England in 1942 and educated at the Royal Grammar School Worcester and Hertford College, Oxford. After three years teaching and writing in California, he joined the Financial Times in London before moving to America. He was the Tokyo bureau chief, 1982–86, and was awarded two British Press Awards for his coverage of Japan.

In 1997, he was awarded an OBE by the Queen. He has been a Woodrow Wilson Visiting Fellow at several US colleges, including Grinnell College in 2002.

References

External links

1942 births
Living people
People educated at the Royal Grammar School Worcester
Alumni of Hertford College, Oxford
Officers of the Order of the British Empire
Financial Times people